Dedh Bigha Zameen is an upcoming Indian Hindi-language film written and directed by Pulkit and produced by T-Series and Karma Media And Entertainment. The film features Pratik Gandhi and Khushali Kumar in the lead roles.

Cast 
 Pratik Gandhi
 Khushali Kumar

Production 
The principal photography of the film began on 18 August 2021 in Jhansi.

References

External links 
 

Upcoming Hindi-language films
Upcoming Indian films
Upcoming films